Simon Handle (born 25 January 1993) is a German professional footballer who plays as a right winger for FC Viktoria Köln.

References

External links
 

Living people
1993 births
German footballers
Association football wingers
Austrian Football Bundesliga players
3. Liga players
2. Bundesliga players
SV Wacker Burghausen players
FC Red Bull Salzburg players
SV Grödig players
FC Erzgebirge Aue players
SV Elversberg players
FC Viktoria Köln players
German expatriate footballers
German expatriate sportspeople in Austria
Expatriate footballers in Austria